EVRS may refer to;
 European Vertical Reference System, see Normaal Amsterdams Peil
 ICAO code for Spilve Airport, Riga